Richard Hooper may refer to:

Richard Hooper (MP), Member of Parliament (MP) for Plymouth
Richard Hooper (Australian politician) (1846–1909), South Australian state MP
Richard Hooper (civil servant), former UK civil servant
Richard Hooper (umpire) (born 1976), New Zealand cricket umpire
Dick Hooper (born 1956), Irish former long-distance runner